Jabalpur North Assembly constituency is one of the 230 Vidhan Sabha (Legislative Assembly) constituencies of Madhya Pradesh state in central India.
Vinay Saxena is the present Member of Legislative Assembly from Indian National Congress.

It is part of Jabalpur district.

Members of Legislative Assembly

See also
 Jabalpur

References

Assembly constituencies of Madhya Pradesh
Jabalpur district